Inape sinuata is a species of moth of the family Tortricidae. It is found in Bolivia and Ecuador (Zamora-Chinchipe Province).

The ground colour of the forewings is pale beige with a dark band and a small black dot. The hindwings are dull white.

References

Moths described in 2003
Moths of South America
sinuata
Taxa named by Józef Razowski